Gomal Pass is a mountain pass on the Durand Line border between Afghanistan and the southeastern portion of South Waziristan in Pakistan's Federally Administered Tribal Areas. It takes its name from the Gomal River and is midway between the legendary Khyber Pass and the Bolan Pass. It connects Ghazni in Afghanistan with Tank and Dera Ismail Khan in Pakistan. Gomal Pass, for a long time, has been a trading route for nomadic Powindahs.

Two Pakistani rivers of Shna Pasta and Shore Mānda as well as  Mandz Rāghah Kowri stream  in Afghanistan flow close to Gomal Pass.

See also
Gomal River
Gomal Zam Dam
Gomal University
Gomal District

References

Mountain passes of Afghanistan
Mountain passes of Khyber Pakhtunkhwa